The Original Rivalry is a rivalry between South Australian-based club Adelaide United and Victorian-based club Melbourne Victory. It is also referred to as 'The Original Derby'.

History

Early matches
The two teams first met in a 2005 Australian Club World Championship Qualifying Tournament match on 7 May 2005 with Adelaide progressing to the next round of qualifying, winning a penalty shootout after the match remained 0–0 after extra time. The teams met again in a friendly match on 26 June 2005 in Bendigo, with the teams finishing 0–0 at full time.

Beginning of rivalry
However, a proper rivalry between the two teams did not begin until 2010, when Adelaide United were defeated twice in an A-League Grand Final both in 2007 and 2009. During the 2008–09 season, they both finished on the top of the ladder equal on both points and the goal difference. The rivalry between both sets of fans remains very strong, since the majority of the matches get an attendance of at least over 12,500.

Cup knockouts and title deciders
Adelaide and Melbourne have met twice in an A-League Grand Final, there have also been Original Rivalry games in the FFA Cup which have significantly contributed to one of the two clubs winning a trophy. These include:

Melbourne Victory 6–0 Adelaide United (18 February 2007) The Grand Final match of the 2006–07 league campaign, with both Adelaide and Melbourne to reach their first A-League Finals trophy. The game had most goals and largest victory in an A-League Grand Final with Archie Thompson scoring five goals and Kristian Sarkies scoring the sixth goal in the third minute of stoppage time.

Melbourne Victory 1–0 Adelaide United (28 February 2009) The Grand Final match of the 2008–09 league campaign, with Adelaide and Melbourne facing each other at Telstra Dome again since the 2007 A-League Grand Final. The final result was a 1–0 scoreline with Tom Pondeljak scoring the goal in the 60th minute.

Melbourne Victory 3–1 Adelaide United (22 September 2015) The FFA Cup Quarter-Finals match to face Hume City next round. After seven minutes, Osama Malik had slid in to Fahid Ben Khalfallah who had given Victory a free kick. Guilherme Finkler opened the scoring after ten minutes via the free-kick. Kosta Barbarouses scored the second just before the half-time whistle. Adelaide had earned a penalty as Daniel Georgievski had fouled Craig Goodwin. Marcelo Carrusca the penalty taker had  successfully converted spot-kick as Lawrence Thomas dived correctly. Besart Berisha had also scored his penalty with ten minutes to go, booking them to the cup semi-final against Hume City.

Adelaide United 3–0 Melbourne Victory (23 August 2017) The FFA Cup Round of 16 match to face Heidelberg United next round. No goals were scored in the first half until Johan Absalonsen scored the opener in the 53rd. Ten minutes later, a penalty was awarded via a handball by Rhys Williams. The penalty was successfully converted by George Blackwood sending Melbourne Victory goalkeeper Lawrence Thomas the wrong way. Nathan Konstandopoulos in the final minute of regular time scored his first FFA Cup goal. After, stoppage time was up. The Reds moved on in the quarter-finals to face Heidelberg United in Melbourne.

Results

Adelaide United vs. Melbourne Victory

Melbourne Victory vs. Adelaide United

Players who played for both clubs
Due to the rivalry between the clubs, 13 players have played for Adelaide United and Melbourne Victory since 2005. The first player to have played for both clubs was Matthew Kemp who joined Adelaide United in 2005 and Melbourne Victory in 2007 Statistics are sourced from ALeagueStats.com and updated as of 27 June 2021.

Adelaide United, then Melbourne Victory

Melbourne Victory, then Adelaide United

Honours

Highest attendances
 Melbourne 6–0 Adelaide; 55,436 (18 February 2007); Telstra Dome
 Melbourne 1–0 Adelaide; 53,273 (28 February 2009); Telstra Dome
 Melbourne 2–1 Adelaide; 47,413 (4 February 2007); Telstra Dome
 Adelaide 1–1 Melbourne; 33,126 (17 October 2014); Adelaide Oval
 Melbourne 0–1 Adelaide; 32,368 (15 October 2006); Telstra Dome

See also
 Sports rivalry

References

Adelaide United FC
Melbourne Victory FC
Australian soccer rivalries